The Licon Dairy is a family-owned farm, dairy, and petting zoo in San Elizario, Texas. The dairy is best known for its asadero cheese. In 2019, a restaurant called the Outlaw Saloon & Grill was opened at Licon Dairy.

About 
Licon Dairy is a fifty acres farm, dairy, and petting zoo in San Elizario, Texas that specializes in making handmade asadero cheese. Every day, they sell around 400 10-slice packages of the cheese. Milk for cheesemaking is sourced from Sarah Farms in El Paso. It may be the only commercial dairy in the United States using traditional Mexican techniques for cheesemaking and people from as far away as New York City and Chicago come to buy asadero cheese from Licon. Other dairy products made at Licon Dairy include ricotta cheese, chile con queso, chile con suero, and whey. 

Licon Dairy features a retail shop and a restaurant called the Outlaw Saloon & Grill. The free petting zoo includes llamas, donkeys, goats, Watusi cattle and other animals. The zoo started out with a pair of six-month old ostriches.

History 
The original asadero cheese recipe used at Licon Dairy dates back to around 1928 and was developed by Isabel Chavez, who made asadero cheese with leftover cow's milk using a recipe from her childhood. The recipe was passed down in the family and was used again by Chavez' daughter, Isabella Martinez, when her family started a dairy in 1948 in San Elizario, Texas. Martinez' daughter, Mary Martinez, married Eugenio Licon in 1958, and together they began helping with the family business. In 1963, Eugenio bought the dairy from his father-in-law and moved it to its current location.

By 1978, the dairy had between 60 to 70 cows and made 200 pounds of asadero cheese every day. By 1980, there were 160 cows. The cheese was made by hand and in the 1980s, there were lines of people waiting to buy the asadero. Nine years later, the dairy continued to hand-make cheese, now around 3,000 to 4,000 a day. In 2022, they were making 400 pounds of cheese a day. 

Due to an endemic illness, the cows were moved to Hudspeth County, Texas and the dairy began to buy the milk to make asadero cheese. In 2004, Eugenio "Boy" Licon, Jr. took over the business. In 2019, Angel Licon opened a restaurant called the Outlaw Saloon & Grill on the property. During the COVID outbreak, the dairy, restaurant, and zoo were briefly shut down.

References

External links 
 Official site
 The Licon Dairy Farm Legacy (2022 documentary film)

El Paso County, Texas
Food and drink companies based in Texas
1963 establishments in Texas
Cheesemakers
Restaurants in Texas
Tourist attractions in El Paso County, Texas
San Elizario, Texas